Ostell is both a given name and a surname. Notable people with the name include:
John Ostell (1813–1892), English-born Canadian architect
Ostell Miles (born 1970), American football player

See also 
Ostel (disambiguation)
Osstell, measurement of the stability of a dental implant